Plasma Pool is an EBM band from Budapest, Hungary that was formed in 1989.

Current members
Attila Csihar - vocals
Istvan Zilahy - keyboards
Lazlo Kuli - drums

Former members
Attila Csihar - vocals (Mayhem, Burial Chamber Trio, Sunn_O))), ex-Aborym, ex-Korog, ex-Keep of Kalessin, ex-Tormentor)

Discography
I (album, studio and live music, 1996)
II — Drowning (album, live, 1997)
III — Sinking (unreleased album)
The Beast of Attila Csihar (selected tracks on compilation, 2003)
Ezoterror (album, studio, 2004)

External links
 www.plasmapool.hu - official page
 The Beast of Attila Csihar

Hungarian musical groups
Musical groups established in 1989
Scarlet Records artists